Cape St. Vincent is a headland in the municipality of Vila do Bispo, in the Algarve, southern Portugal. It is the southwesternmost point of Portugal and of mainland Europe.

History 
Cape St. Vincent was already sacred ground in Neolithic times, as standing menhirs in the neighborhood attest. The ancient Greeks called it Ophiussa (Land of Serpents), inhabited by the Oestriminis and dedicated here a temple to Heracles. The Romans called it Promontorium Sacrum (or Holy Promontory). Strabo, in his Geography calls this cape the most western tip of the known world and reports the place was considered magical. Common people believed the sun sank here hissing into the ocean, marking the edge of their world, which Strabo qualifies as "common and vulgar reports" and attributes to Posidonius

According to legend, the current name of this cape is linked to the story of a martyred fourth-century Iberian deacon St. Vincent whose body was brought ashore here. A shrine was erected over his grave; according to the Arab geographer Al-Idrisi, it was always guarded by ravens and is therefore named by him كنيسة الغراب (Kanīsah al-Ghurāb, meaning "Church of the Raven").  King Afonso Henriques (1139–1185) had the body of the saint exhumed in 1173 and brought it by ship to Lisbon, still accompanied by the ravens.  This transfer of the relics is depicted on the coat of arms of Lisbon. All existing buildings—including the Vila do Infante of Henry the Navigator—fell into ruins because of the Lisbon earthquake of 1755. The Franciscan friars who cared for the shrine stayed on until 1834, when all monasteries were disbanded in Portugal.

Naval battles
Several naval battles have been fought in the vicinity of this cape:
 In 1337, a Castilian fleet defeated a Portuguese fleet in the Battle of Cape St. Vincent (1337).
 In 1606, a Spanish fleet defeated a Dutch fleet in the Battle of Cape St. Vincent (1606).
 In 1641, a Spanish fleet fought with a Dutch fleet in the Battle of Cape St. Vincent (1641).
 In 1681, a Spanish fleet defeated a Brandenburger fleet in the action of 30 September 1681.
 In 1693, a French fleet  defeated an Anglo-Dutch fleet in the Battle of Lagos (1693).
 In 1719, a Spanish fleet defeated a British fleet in the Battle of Cape St. Vincent (1719).
 In 1751, a Spanish fleet defeated an Algerian fleet in the action of 28 November 1751.
 In 1780, a British fleet defeated a Spanish fleet in the Battle of Cape St. Vincent (1780).
 In 1797, a British fleet defeated a Spanish fleet in the Battle of Cape St. Vincent (1797).  
 In 1833, a Loyalist fleet defeated a Miguelite fleet in the Battle of Cape St. Vincent (1833).

Geography

This cape is the southwesternmost point in Portugal. Approximately six kilometers from the village of Sagres, the cape is a landmark for a ship traveling to or from the Mediterranean. The cliffs rise nearly vertically from the Atlantic to a height of 75 meters. The cape is a site of exuberant marine life and a high concentration of birds nesting on the cliffs, such as the rare Bonelli's eagle, peregrine falcons, kites, rock thrushes, rock pigeons, storks and herons.

Climate
Cape St. Vincent has a Mediterranean climate with very low seasonal variation and high occurrence of fogs.

Gallery

References

Notes

Sources
 
 

Geography of the Algarve
Sao Vicente, Cabo de
Sao Vicente, Cabo de
Locations in Greek mythology
Tourist attractions in the Algarve